The 1960 Texas Western Miners football team was an American football team that represented Texas Western College (now known as University of Texas at El Paso) as a member of the Border Conference during the 1960 NCAA University Division football season. In its fourth season under head coach Ben Collins, the team compiled a 4–5–1 record (2–3 against Border Conference opponents), finished fourth in the conference, and was outscored by a total of 176 to 167.

Schedule

References

Texas Western
UTEP Miners football seasons
Texas Western Miners football